This is a list of continents and continental subregions by population.

Distribution of populations by the United Nations geoscheme

Global, continental, and subregional totals from 1950 to

Africa

Americas

North America

South America

Asia

Europe

Oceania

World

See also 

 Human geography
 List of countries and dependencies by area
 List of countries and dependencies by population
 List of countries and dependencies by population density
 List of countries by past and projected future population
 List of countries by population in 1900
 List of countries by population in 2005
 List of countries by population in 2010
 List of population concern organizations
 List of religious populations
 List of sovereign states
 World population

References

Source 
 All figures come from the 2015 Revision of the United Nations World Population Prospects.

Population, list
Continents